Xie Siyi (born 28 March 1996) is a Chinese diver. He has won four gold medals at the World Championships and two Olympic gold medals.

Career
Xie's previous main event was 10m platform and his partner was Chen Aisen. However, due to a serious injury in 2012, he began focusing more on springboard. At the 2015 World Aquatics Championships, he became a new world champion after winning the gold medal of 1m springboard. He also won a gold in 3m springboard at the 2017 World Aquatics Championships held in Budapest.

In 2018, Xie took part in his first World Cup event held in Wuhan, and won a gold in the 3m synchro partnered with Cao Yuan, as well as a gold in the individual 3m event.

At the 2019 World Aquatics Championships held in Gwangju, South Korea, he again won gold in the 3m springboard event. Xie again partnered with Cao Yuan in the 3m synchro, and won gold with their last dive.

At the 2020 Tokyo Olympics, Xie won the gold in the 3m springboard event. He scored over 85 points with each of his six dives to reach a total score of 558.75 and broke the Men's Olympics 3m springboard record. He also partnered with Wang Zongyuan in the men’s 3m synchro event and the pair won gold.

References

External links

Chinese male divers
1996 births
Living people
World Aquatics Championships medalists in diving
People from Shantou
Asian Games medalists in diving
Divers at the 2018 Asian Games
Asian Games gold medalists for China
Medalists at the 2018 Asian Games
Olympic divers of China
Divers at the 2020 Summer Olympics
Medalists at the 2020 Summer Olympics
Olympic medalists in diving
Olympic gold medalists for China
21st-century Chinese people
20th-century Chinese people